Kissin (also spelled Kisein) is a village in northern Syria, administratively part of the Homs Governorate, located north of Homs. According to the Syria Central Bureau of Statistics (CBS), Kissin had a population of 2,189 in the 2004 census. Its inhabitants are predominantly Turkmen Sunni Muslims.

References

Populated places in al-Rastan District
Turkmen communities in Syria